Roberto Ramírez (born 18 June 1993) is a Mexican former professional footballer who last played for Celaya on loan from UNAM.

External links

Living people
Mexican footballers
Club Universidad Nacional footballers
Liga MX players
1993 births
Association football forwards
Liga de Balompié Mexicano players